Dangerous Moments, Martin Briley's third album, was released in 1985. The album art (which is an up-perspective shot of Briley juxtaposed against an inverted cityscape) was nominated for a Grammy.

Track listing
All songs written by Martin Briley, except where noted.

 "Dangerous Moments"
 "Think of Me" (Martin Briley, Nick Gilder)
 "Ghosts"
 "It Shouldn't Have To Hurt That Much" (Briley, Peter Wood)
 "Alone At Last"
 "Before the Party Ends"
 "If This Is What It Means" (Briley, Rob Fahey)
 "Dirty Windows"
 "School for Dogs"
 "Underwater"

Personnel
Martin Briley - lead and backing vocals, guitar, synthesizer, percussion
Dennis Herring, G.E. Smith - guitar
Peter Wood, David Lebolt - synthesizers, piano
Carmine Rojas - bass
Anton Fig, Frank Vilardi, Steve Holley - drums
Anthony MacDonald, Ralph MacDonald - percussion
David Grahame, David Lasley, Ellen Foley, Eric Troyer, Rory Dodd - backing vocals

References

1985 albums
Martin Briley albums
Albums produced by Phil Ramone
Mercury Records albums